Tegeticula maderae is a moth of the family Prodoxidae. It is found in south-eastern Arizona, United States. The habitat consists of pine-oak forests.

The wingspan is 15-21.5 mm.

The larvae feed on Yucca schottii.

References

Moths described in 1999
Prodoxidae